Staškovce is a village and municipality in Stropkov District in the Prešov Region of north-eastern Slovakia.

History
In historical records the village was first mentioned in 1414.

Geography
The municipality lies at an altitude of 280 metres and covers an area of 8.452 km2. It has a population of about 277 people.

References

External links
 
 
Statistical Office of the Slovak Republic

Villages and municipalities in Stropkov District